F-22: Air Dominance Fighter is a combat flight simulator video game developed by Digital Image Design and published by Ocean Software for the PC Windows in 1997. The game simulates the F-22 Raptor stealth fighter. It was preceded by EF2000 and was succeeded by F-22 Total Air War. An expansion, Red Sea Operations, was released in August 1998.

Gameplay

Reception

F22: Air Dominance Fighter was nominated in the Academy of Interactive Arts & Sciences' first annual Interactive Achievement Awards in the category "Computer Simulation Game of the Year". F-22 ADF was also a runner-up for Computer Gaming Worlds 1997 "Simulation Game of the Year" award, which ultimately went to Longbow 2. The editors wrote that F-22 ADF "featured dazzling graphics, great flight modeling, and immersive missions, which made this game not only authentic, but fun as well."

References

External links 
F-22: Air Dominance Fighter at MobyGames
F-22: Air Dominance Fighter: Red Sea Operations at MobyGames

1997 video games
Combat flight simulators
Video games with expansion packs
Infogrames games
Windows games
Windows-only games
Ocean Software games
Digital Image Design games
Video games developed in the United Kingdom